For the Freedom of the East is a lost 1918 silent film drama directed by Ira M. Lowry and starring Lady Tsen Mei (born Josephine Augusta Moy). It was produced by Betzwood Pictures, an organization distantly affiliated with the soon to be defunct Lubin Manufacturing Company and distributed by Goldwyn Pictures.

Cast
Lady Tsen Mei - Princess Tsu
Lai Mon Kim - The Viceroy
H. H. Pattee - Von Richtman (*Herbert Horton Pattee)
Ben Hendricks - Prince Kang
Robert Elliott - Robert Kenyon
Neil Moran - Minister Emmons, American Consul
Joe Chong - ?
Rosie Moey - ?
Lee Poy - ?
Edward Lee - ?
Gilbert Leong - ?

References

External links

 For the Freedom of the East at IMDb.com

lobby poster

1918 films
American silent feature films
Lost American films
Goldwyn Pictures films
American black-and-white films
Silent American drama films
1918 drama films
1918 lost films
Lost drama films
1910s American films
1910s English-language films